Plunket Point is a conspicuous rock point marking the northern end of the Dominion Range and the confluence of the Beardmore and Mill Glaciers. Discovered by the British Antarctic Expedition (1907–09) and named for Lord Plunket, at that time Governor of New Zealand.

Headlands of the Ross Dependency
Dufek Coast